Adamsville was a populated place in Pinal County, Arizona. Once a thriving farm town, it became a ghost town by the 1920s.  Adamsville is located at an elevation is 1,450 feet, on the south bank of the Gila River, west of Florence, Arizona.

History
Adamsville was one of the first two towns formed in Pinal County, Arizona.  It was named for its original settler in 1866, Fred A. Adams.  When a post office was established there in 1871, it was named Sanford, (for a Captain George B. Sanford of the First U.S. Cavalry), by a political enemy of Mr. Adams, Richard McCormick. The town had stores, homes, a post office and a flour mill and water tanks. Local residents continued to use the original name, causing confusion which existed until 1876, when the post office was discontinued.  In 1900, the Gila River overflowed and wiped out most of the town. Those who survived the flood moved to the town of Florence. The inscription on the marker reads as follows: "In the 1870s, a flour mill and a few stores formed the hub of life in Adamsville, where shootings and knifings were commonplace, and life was one of the cheapest commodities. Most of the adobe houses have been washed away by the flooding Gila River". Listed in the National Register of Historic Places in 1970, reference #10000114. The entire settlement was gone by 1920. Adams died in 1910 and is buried in the Adamsville A.O.U.W. (Ancient Order of United Workmen) Cemetery.

Demographics

Adamsville first appeared on the 1870 U.S. Census as an unincorporated village. It was then located within Pima County. It became a part of Pinal County with its creation in 1875. It reported 400 residents in 1870, all White. It was tied with the village of Apache Pass as the then-second most populous locale in Pima County, behind Tucson, and was the fourth largest recorded community in the entire territory of Arizona. In 1880, it reported as the village of Sanford, with just 39 residents. It was the second-least recorded populated community, tied with the village of Plomosa, and just ahead of Casa Grande. It did not report again on the census.

Remaining structures

Cemetery
Historic Adamsville A.O.U.W. Cemetery – The Pioneers' Cemetery Association (PCA) maintains the  "historic cemetery" (one which has been in existence for more than fifty years) in Adamsville. Among those interred in the cemetery and whose graves are pictured are:
 Fred A. Adams – Founder of Adamsville.
 Judge H. B. Summers
 Capt. Granville Henderson Oury – Judge: District court of New Mexico. Delegate to Confederate Congress. Arizona Mounted Volunteers CSA, Territorial legislator to U. S Congress, Pioneer-Soldier-Statesman.
 Felix Grunde and his wife Martha Angeline Hardwick – Family known as the Hardwick pioneers
 The Stevens family – Olnorah Stevens, wife of Daniel C. Stevens; Carmen Sarah Stevens, daughter of Daniel C. & Ollie N. Stevens and Taylor Stevens, infant son of Daniel C. and Mary E. Stevens

See also

 List of historic properties in Florence, Arizona
 National Register of Historic Places listings in Pinal County, Arizona

References

1866 establishments in Arizona Territory
Cemeteries in Arizona
Former populated places in Pinal County, Arizona
Ghost towns in Arizona
National Register of Historic Places in Pinal County, Arizona
Populated places on the National Register of Historic Places in Arizona